The 2013 Women's Hockey Africa Cup of Nations was the sixth edition of the Women's Hockey Africa Cup of Nations, the quadrennial international women's field hockey championship of Africa organised by the African Hockey Federation. It was held in Nairobi, Kenya from 18 to 23 November 2013.

The winner qualified for the 2014 Women's Hockey World Cup.

Results

Preliminary round

Third place game

Final

Final standings

Goalscorers

See also
2013 Men's Hockey Africa Cup of Nations

References

External links
Official website

Women's Hockey Africa Cup of Nations
Africa Cup of Nations
Hockey Africa Cup of Nations
Sport in Nairobi
International field hockey competitions hosted by Kenya
Hockey Africa Cup of Nations
2010s in Nairobi
Africa Cup of Nations